Claudius Pulcher may refer to:
 Appius Claudius Pulcher (disambiguation), Romans
 Gaius Claudius Pulcher (disambiguation), Romans
 Publius Claudius Pulcher (disambiguation), Romans

See also 

 
 Claudii Pulchri